Forest Home is a town in Belize's Toledo District.

It was originally settled by Caucasian American refugees from the United States who had fled during the American Civil War.

Populated places in Toledo District